Volyn Oblast (also referred to as Volyn or Lodomeria) is an oblast (province) in northwestern Ukraine. Its administrative centre is Lutsk. Kovel is the westernmost town and the last station in Ukraine on the rail line running from Kyiv to Warsaw. The population is

History

Volyn was once part of the Kyivan Rus' before becoming an independent local principality and an integral part of the Kingdom of Galicia–Volhynia, one of Kyivan Rus' successor states. In the 15th century, the area came under the control of the neighbouring Grand Duchy of Lithuania, in 1569 passing over to Poland and then in 1795, until World War I, to the Russian Empire where it was a part of the Volynskaya Guberniya. In the interwar period, most of the territory, organized as Wołyń Voivodeship was under Polish control.

In 1939 when Poland was invaded and divided by Nazi Germany and the Soviet Union following the Molotov-Ribbentrop pact, Volyn was joined to Soviet Ukraine, and on December 4, 1939, the oblast was organized.

Many Ukrainians rejoiced at the "reunification", but the Polish minority suffered a cruel fate. Thousands of Poles, especially retired Polish officers and intelligentsia were deported to Siberia and other areas in the depths of the Soviet Union. A high proportion of these deportees died in the extreme conditions of Soviet labour camps and most were never able to return to Volyn again.

In 1941 Volyn along with the Soviet Union was invaded by the Nazi Germany's Barbarossa Offensive. Nazis  alongside Ukrainian collaborators completed their holocaust of the Jews of Volhynia in late 1942.

Partisan activity started in Volyn in 1941, soon after German occupation. Partisans were involved in the Rail war campaign against German supply lines and were known for their efficiency in gathering intelligence and for sabotage. The region formed the basis of several networks and many members of the local population served with the partisans. The Poles in the area became part of the Polish Home Army, which often undertook operations with the partisan movement.

UPA initially supported Nazi Germany which had in turn supported them with financing and weaponry before the start of World War II. Many served in the various RONA and SS units. Once they became disillusioned with the Nazi program, they independently began to target all non-Ukrainians (Poles, Jews, Russians, among others) for extermination. Some 30,000 to 60,000 Poles, Czechs, remaining Jews, and Ukrainians who tried to help others escape (Polish sources gave even higher figures) and later, around 2,000 or more Ukrainians were killed in retaliation (see Massacres of Poles in Volhynia).

In January 1944 the Red Army recaptured the territory from the Nazis.

In the immediate aftermath of World War II the Polish-Soviet border was redrawn based on the Curzon line. Volyn, along with the neighbouring provinces became an integral part of the Ukrainian SSR. Most Poles who remained in the eastern region were forced to leave to the Recovered Territories of western Poland (the former easternmost provinces of Germany) whose German population had been expelled. Some of the Ukrainians on the western side, notably around the city of Kholm (Chełm in Polish), were also forcibly relocated to Ukraine.

The area underwent rapid industrialisation including the construction of the Lutskiy Avtomobilnyi Zavod. Nevertheless, the area remains one of the most rural throughout the former Soviet Union.

Historical sites
The following historical-cultural sites were nominated in 2007 for the Seven Wonders of Ukraine.
 Upper Castle
 Volodymyr historical-cultural complex
 Villa-museum of Lesia Ukrainka

Relics
 Painting of the Holm's Virgin Mary

Politics
Former Chairmen of Oblast Council
 2006 – Vasyl Dmytruk Lytvyn's Bloc
 2006 – Anatoliy Hrytsiuk

Subdivisions

The Volyn Oblast is administratively subdivided into 4 raions (districts).

Demography

Age structure
 0–14 years: 19.0%  (male 101,739/female 95,332)
 15–64 years: 68.2%  (male 344,359/female 363,116)
 65 years and over: 12.8%  (male 42,221/female 90,463) (2013 official)

Median age
 total: 35.7 years 
 male: 33.2 years 
 female: 38.3 years  (2013 official)

Notable people

Oleh Skvira (born 2000), Ukrainian professional football player
Vitaliy Kvartsyanyi (born 1953), Ukrainian football manager and former player.

See also

List of villages in Volyn Oblast

References

External links
 Volyn Oblast State Administration 
 Volyn Region (Newspaper) 
 Picture album 

 
Oblasts of Ukraine
States and territories established in 1939
1939 establishments in Ukraine